Without Honor is a 1949 film noir directed by Irving Pichel and starring Bruce Bennett, Laraine Day, Dane Clark, Agnes Moorehead, and Franchot Tone.

Plot
Jane, a housewife, is confronted during her daily chores by Dennis, her married lover with whom she has had a long affair. Dennis tells Jane that he has to break off their relationship.  She threatens suicide, but when she picks up a shish kabob skewer, the two struggle and Dennis is stabbed in the chest and collapses.  Jane hides the body in the house.  Before she can leave, her brother-in-law arrives and tells her that he knows about the affair and that he has invited her husband, her lover, and his wife to her house that evening so that he can tell them about the affair.  Jane, in a panic worrying that they will find out about the killing, attempts to flee but cannot get away from her vengeful brother-in-law.

Cast
 Bruce Bennett as Fred Bandle
 Dane Clark as Bill Bandle
 Agnes Moorehead as Katherine Williams
 Laraine Day as Jane Bandle
 Franchot Tone as Dennis Williams

Reception
Arthur Lions notes in Death on the Cheap: The Lost B Movies of Film Noir, "A top-notch cast is wasted in a total clunker. The film takes the award, however, for the movie with the shortest performance by a top-billed star. Leading man Tone, after his brief initial appearance, spends most of the picture as the "corpse" in the laundry room."

The film was entered into the 1949 Cannes Film Festival.

References

External links
 
 
 
 

1949 films
1949 drama films
Adultery in films
American black-and-white films
American drama films
Film noir
Films about murder
Films directed by Irving Pichel
Films with screenplays by James Poe
United Artists films
1940s English-language films
1940s American films